Mystery (浮城謎事) is a 2012 Chinese drama film directed by Lou Ye. This is Lou Ye's seventh film but only the second (with Purple Butterfly in 2003) to have been released in his own country. The story is based on a series of posts under the title of "This Is How I Punish A Cheating Man And His Mistress" (《看我如何收拾贱男与小三》), which has over one million hits. "Mystery is beautiful and violent, both in the emotions it deals with and the scenes that display them. It echoes some of contemporary China's own problems, such as corruption, money, ambiguity and morality," says Brice Pedroletti in his review on The Guardian

The film competed in the Un Certain Regard section at the 2012 Cannes Film Festival. At the 7th Asian Film Awards the film won the Asian Film Award for Best Film.

Plot
Lu Jie has no idea her husband Yongzhao is leading a double life, until the day she sees him entering a hotel with a young woman. Her world crumbles – and it is just the beginning.

Cast
 Hao Lei as Lu Jie - Qiao Yongzhao's wife, and they have one daughter.
 Qin Hao as Qiao Yongzhao - The male protagonist.
 Qi Xi as Sang Qi/Sang Hailan - Qiao Yongzhao's mistress, and they have a son.

References

External links
 

2012 films
2012 drama films
Chinese drama films
Films directed by Lou Ye
Films scored by Jóhann Jóhannsson
Asian Film Award for Best Film winners
2010s Mandarin-language films